Robert Knollys may refer to:

Robert Knolles (c. 1320–1407), also known as Knollys, English soldier of the Hundred Years' War
Robert Knollys (courtier) (died 1521), also known as Knolles, English courtier in the service of Henry VII and Henry VIII of England
Robert Knollys (MP for Breconshire) (1547–1619), MP for Reading and Breconshire and grandson of the above
Robert Knollys (politician, died 1626), MP for Reading (UK Parliament constituency)
Robert Knollys (politician, died 1659) (1588–1659), MP for Abingdon and Wallingford and nephew of Robert Knollys (died 1619)

See also
Robert Knowles (disambiguation), same pronunciation